Sedimenticola is a moderately halophilic and obligately chemolithoautotrophic, genus of bacteria from the class Gammaproteobacteria with one known species (Thiohalobacter thiocyanaticus). Thiohalobacter thiocyanaticus has been isolated from sediments from hypersaline lakes from the Kulunda Steppe in Russia.

References

Gammaproteobacteria
Bacteria genera
Monotypic bacteria genera